Raphael Glorieux (26 January 1929 – 19 August 1986) was a Belgian cyclist. He competed in the team pursuit event at the 1948 Summer Olympics.

References

1929 births
1986 deaths
Belgian male cyclists
Olympic cyclists of Belgium
Cyclists at the 1948 Summer Olympics
Cyclists from Hainaut (province)
People from Quévy
20th-century Belgian people